The United Kingdom held a national selection to choose the song that would go to the Eurovision Song Contest 1964. It was held on 7 February 1964 and presented by David Jacobs.

Matt Monro was chosen to sing the entry and juries made up of members of the public in sixteen UK cities selected I Love the Little Things for him to sing at the Eurovision final, where it placed 2nd in the contest. Monro released all six songs from the UK final on an Extended Play maxi single A Song for Europe, which reached number 16 in the EP top 20 chart. He subsequently released the winning song on single, with the runner up on the B-Side, but this single failed to reach the official UK singles chart.

Before Eurovision

A Song for Europe 1964

At Eurovision 
"I Love the Little Things" won the national and went on to come 2nd in the contest.

At the Eurovision the BBC TV commentary was provided by David Jacobs, whilst Ian Fenner provided radio commentary for British Forces Radio.

The Austrian entry in the 1964 contest "Warum nur, warum?", performed by songwriter Udo Jürgens, caught Monro's ear, despite its sixth-place finish, and he recorded an English version titled "Walk Away" (lyric by Monro's manager Don Black), earning him another hit single late in 1964.

Voting

References 

1964
Countries in the Eurovision Song Contest 1964
Eurovision
Eurovision